The following is a list of films produced in the Kannada film industry in India in 1983, presented in alphabetical order.

See also

Kannada films of 1982
Kannada films of 1984

References

1983
Kannada
Films, Kannada